Valine N-monooxygenase (CYP79D1, CYP79D2) is an enzyme with systematic name L-valine,NADPH:oxygen oxidoreductase (N-hydroxylating). This enzyme catalyses the following chemical reaction

 L-valine + 2 O2 + 2 NADPH + 2 H+  (E)-2-methylpropanal oxime + 2 NADP+ + CO2 + 3 H2O (overall reaction)
(1a) L-valine + O2 + NADPH + H+  N-hydroxy-L-valine + NADP+ + H2O
(1b) N-hydroxy-L-valine + O2 + NADPH + H+  N,N-dihydroxy-L-valine + NADP+ + H2O
(1c) N,N-dihydroxy-L-valine  (E)-2-methylpropanal oxime + CO2 + H2O (spontaneous reaction)

Valine N-monooxygenase is a heme-thiolate protein (P-450).

References

External links 
 

EC 1.14.13